Missing Pieces is the fourth studio album by American glam metal band Autograph. It was released initially in 1997 on the Pavement Music label, then re-released in both 2002 and 2004 by Crash Music, Inc. The material was recorded for an album intended for a 1989 release, but the project was abandoned and the group disbanded.

Track listing

References

Autograph (American band) albums
1997 albums